The Telebugs is a British animated children's television series featuring three robots.

Overview
The robots' names are C.H.I.P. (Coordinated Hexadecimal Information Processor), S.A.M.A.N.T.H.A. (Solar Activated Micro Automated Non-inTerference Hearing Apparatus) and B.U.G. (Binary Unmanned Gamma camera) – who were accompanied by a flying video pack called M.I.C. (Mobile Independent Camera). They were invented by Professor Brainstrain (who is also known as Pwofessor Bwainstwain, owing to his unfortunate speech impediment) to stop enemies such as Baron Bullybyte, Magna, Angel Brain, Z.U.D.O (Zero-failure Universal Data Optimizer) Bug and Arcadia, whilst working as reporters for a TV executive named Mr McStarch.

A total of 3 seasons and 86 episodes were produced by Telemagination for Telebug Enterprises and broadcast on Children's ITV in the United Kingdom from 1986 to 1987.

It was the very first television series made and produced by Telemagination (the company later went onto make several other animated series for children such as The Animals of Farthing Wood, Noah's Island and The Cramp Twins).

It also aired on TV2 in New Zealand from 24 July 1987 to 7 March 1990, on ABC TV in Australia from 6 July 1988 to 13 December 1991, on ABS-CBN in the Philippines, on RTB in Brunei, on TV1 in Malaysia, on Italia 1 in Italy, on Saudi 2 in Saudi Arabia and on M-Net in South Africa.

The series was also noted for its closing theme song. An extended version of the opening theme had been used at the end of season 1. However, in season 2 the short song "I Have a Heart", written by American singer, pianist and songwriter Mort Shuman (who has lived in both the UK and France), sung by Suzy Westerby (as Samantha), and played out over a closing credit sequence featuring a still of Chip, Samantha and Bug, with Mic's face briefly appearing at the closeout, was used as the closing theme. This version was the best-known theme. An extended version of "I Have A Heart", sung by American disco singer George McCrae and played out over a sequence showing Chip, Samantha and Bug orbiting the earth and performing pirouettes, was used for the end of the original transmissions of the third, and final, season. However, as this version was almost three minutes long, it was considered too lengthy for such a short cartoon, and was replaced with the same extended version of the opening theme used at the end of season 1 for all future repeats of season 3.

The series also aired on GBC TV in Gibraltar, where it regularly served as a filler during children's programming in the 6:30 – 7:30pm slot during the mid to late 1980s.

The series was also broadcast on cable and satellite television on The Children's Channel.

In the 1990s the show was sold to HIT Entertainment but this time, the name was changed to The Gigglebytes. The series with the name change was also broadcast in Singapore on Prime 12 as part of their lineup of children's programming Kidz Blitz.

Voice cast
All the male characters were voiced by Ron Moody (except for Bug) and the female characters (also including Bug) were voiced by London-based actress Suzy Westerby.

Transmission guide

Series 1

Series 2

Series 3

References

External links

1980s British animated television series
1980s British children's television series
1980s British science fiction television series
1986 British television series debuts
1987 British television series endings
British children's animated space adventure television series
British children's animated science fiction television series
English-language television shows
ITV children's television shows
Australian Broadcasting Corporation original programming
TVNZ 2 original programming
Fictional anthropomorphic characters
Television shows produced by Television South (TVS)
Television series by Mattel Creations